The following lists events that happened during 1991 in Armenia.

Incumbents
 President: Levon Ter-Petrosyan
 Prime Minister: Vazgen Manukyan (until 22 November), Gagik Harutyunyan (from 22 November)

Events

September
 September 21 - Armenia declares independence from the Soviet Union.

October
 October 17 - The first ever presidential election is held in Armenia, the result was a victory for Levon Ter-Petrosyan.

References

 
1990s in Armenia
Years of the 20th century in Armenia
Armenia
Armenia
Armenia